Sandman Hotel Group is a Canadian hotel chain owned by Northland Properties. With the corporate headquarters based in Vancouver, British Columbia, Canada, the company currently has 47 properties across Canada under the brands Sandman Inns, Sandman Hotel & Suites, and Sandman Signature Hotels & Resorts. Three Sandman Signature properties now operate in the UK based in Newcastle, Aberdeen and London Gatwick, alongside a resort in Ireland; Portmarnock Hotel & Golf Links.

In 1967, the first Sandman Inn opened in Smithers, British Columbia. The company rapidly expanded, opening at least one property every year. In 1976, a new tier of hotels was added to the company profile with Sandman Hotel Vancouver. In 2007, the Sandman Signature brand was added as a higher end brand.

Tom Gaglardi is Chief Executive Officer for Sandman Hotel Group.

Brands
Sandman Inns are situated along major travel routes and were the first tier of hotels that Northland established in Canada. They cater to the frequent traveller including on-site restaurants with room service.

Sandman Hotel & Suites is a mid-range brand with over 27 locations, in city centres, growing districts, and near major airports. The brand has amenities such as Northland-owned restaurants, room service, and fitness facilities.

Sandman Signature Hotels & Resorts is an upscale brand launched in 2007, with high-end amenities and conveniences such as spas, restaurants, rooms, business centres, concierge, and valet service.

Properties

Sandman Inns
British Columbia: 9

Sandman Hotel & Suites
British Columbia: 15
Alberta: 7
Saskatchewan: 2
Manitoba: 1
Ontario 3
Quebec: 1

Sandman Signature Hotels & Resorts
British Columbia:  4
Alberta: 3
Ontario: 2
Newfoundland & Labrador: 1 
United States: 1
United Kingdom: 3
Ireland: 1

References

Northland Properties
Canadian brands
Hotel and leisure companies of Canada
Hotel chains in Canada